The insect order Lepidoptera consists of moths (43 superfamilies), most of which are night-flying, and a derived group, mainly day-flying, called butterflies (superfamily Papilionoidea). Within Lepidoptera as a whole, the groups listed below before Glossata contain a few basal families accounting for less than 200 species; the bulk of Lepidoptera are in the Glossata. Similarly, within the Glossata, there are a few basal groups listed first, with the bulk of species in the Heteroneura. Basal groups within Heteroneura cannot be defined with as much confidence, as there are still some disputes concerning the proper relations among these groups. At the family level, however, most groups are well defined, and the families are commonly used by hobbyists and scientists alike.

Unassigned fossil lepidopterans
Family unassigned (12 genera, 16 species)
Family Archaeolepidae
Family Mesokristenseniidae
Family Eolepidopterigidae
Family Undopterigidae

Suborder Zeugloptera
Superfamily Micropterigoidea
Family Micropterigidae

Suborder Aglossata
Superfamily Agathiphagoidea
Family Agathiphagidae

Suborder Heterobathmiina
Superfamily Heterobathmioidea
Family Heterobathmiidae

Suborder Glossata

Infraorder Dacnonypha

Superfamily Eriocranioidea
Family Eriocraniidae

Clade Coelolepida, encompassing all remaining groups

Infraorder Acanthoctesia
Superfamily Acanthopteroctetoidea
Family Acanthopteroctetidae

Infraorder Lophocoronina
Superfamily Lophocoronoidea
Family Lophocoronidae

Clade Myoglossata, encompassing all remaining groups

Infraorder Neopseustina
Superfamily Neopseustoidea
Family Neopseustidae
Family Aenigmatineidae

Clade Neolepidoptera, encompassing all remaining groups

Infraorder Exoporia

Superfamily Mnesarchaeoidea
Family Mnesarchaeidae
Superfamily Hepialoidea
Family Palaeosetidae
Family Prototheoridae
Family Neotheoridae
Family Anomosetidae
Family Hepialidae

Infraorder Heteroneura

Clade Nepticulina
Superfamily Nepticuloidea
Family Nepticulidae
Family Opostegidae

Clade Eulepidoptera, encompassing all remaining groups

Clade Incurvariina
Superfamily Andesianoidea
Family Andesianidae
Superfamily Adeloidea
Family Heliozelidae
Family Adelidae
Family Incurvariidae
Family Cecidosidae
Family Prodoxidae

Clade Etimonotrysia

Superfamily Palaephatoidea
Family Palaephatidae
Superfamily Tischerioidea
Family Tischeriidae

Clade Ditrysia, encompassing all remaining groups
unassigned (25 genera, 100 species)
Family Millieriidae
Superfamily Tineoidea
Family Acrolophidae
Family Arrhenophanidae
Family Eriocottidae
Family Psychidae
Family Tineidae
Superfamily Gracillarioidea
Family Roeslerstammiidae
Family Bucculatricidae
Family Gracillariidae
Superfamily Yponomeutoidea
Family Yponomeutidae
Family Argyresthiidae
Family Plutellidae
Family Glyphipterigidae
Family Ypsolophidae
Family Attevidae
Family Praydidae
Family Heliodinidae
Family Bedelliidae
Family Lyonetiidae

Clade Apoditrysia, encompassing all remaining groups
unassigned superfamily
Family Prodidactidae
Family Douglasiidae
Superfamily Simaethistoidea
Family Simaethistidae
Superfamily Gelechioidea
Family Autostichidae
Family Lecithoceridae
Family Xyloryctidae
Family Blastobasidae
Family Oecophoridae
Family Schistonoeidae
Family Lypusidae
Family Chimabachidae
Family Peleopodidae
Family Elachistidae
Family Syringopaidae
Family Coelopoetidae
Family Stathmopodidae
Family Epimarptidae
Family Batrachedridae
Family Coleophoridae
Family Momphidae
Family Pterolonchidae
Family Scythrididae
Family Cosmopterigidae
Family Gelechiidae
Superfamily Alucitoidea
Family Tineodidae
Family Alucitidae
Superfamily Pterophoroidea
Family Pterophoridae
Superfamily Carposinoidea
Family Copromorphidae
Family Carposinidae
Superfamily Schreckensteinioidea
Family Schreckensteiniidae
Superfamily Epermenioidea
Family Epermeniidae
Superfamily Urodoidea
Family Urodidae
Family Ustyurtiidae
Superfamily Immoidea
Family Immidae
Superfamily Choreutoidea
Family Choreutidae
Superfamily Galacticoidea
Family Galacticidae
Superfamily Tortricoidea
Family Tortricidae
Superfamily Cossoidea
Family Brachodidae
Family Cossidae
Family Dudgeoneidae
Family Metarbelidae
Family Ratardidae
Family Castniidae
Family Sesiidae
Superfamily Zygaenoidea
Family Epipyropidae
Family Cyclotornidae
Family Heterogynidae
Family Lacturidae
Family Phaudidae
Family Dalceridae
Family Limacodidae
Family Megalopygidae
Family Aididae
Family Somabrachyidae
Family Himantopteridae
Family Zygaenidae

Clade Obtectomera, encompassing all remaining groups
Superfamily Whalleyanoidea
Family Whalleyanidae
Superfamily Thyridoidea
Family Thyrididae
Superfamily Hyblaeoidea
Family Hyblaeidae
Superfamily Calliduloidea
Family Callidulidae
Superfamily Papilionoidea (butterflies)
Family Papilionidae
Family Hedylidae
Family Hesperiidae
Family Pieridae
Family Riodinidae
Family Lycaenidae
Family Nymphalidae
Superfamily Pyraloidea
Family Pyralidae
Family Crambidae
Superfamily Mimallonoidea
Family Mimallonidae

Clade Macroheterocera (Macrolepidoptera sensu sticto), encompassing all remaining groups

Superfamily Drepanoidea
Family Cimeliidae
Family Doidae
Family Drepanidae
Superfamily Lasiocampoidea
Family Lasiocampidae
Superfamily Bombycoidea
Family Apatelodidae
Family Eupterotidae
Family Brahmaeidae
Family Phiditiidae
Family Anthelidae
Family Carthaeidae
Family Endromidae
Family Bombycidae
Family Saturniidae
Family Sphingidae
Superfamily Geometroidea
Family Epicopeiidae
Family Pseudobistonidae
Family Sematuridae
Family Uraniidae
Family Geometridae
Superfamily Noctuoidea
Family Oenosandridae
Family Notodontidae
Family Erebidae
Family Euteliidae
Family Nolidae
Family Noctuidae

References

  (Editor). (2008). Encyclopedia of Entomology, (2nd Ed). Springer Reference. , . Limited preview in Google Books.
.
  (1995) The Lepidoptera: form, function and diversity. The Oxford University Press, Oxford UK. . Ltd preview in Google Books.

Moth taxonomy
 Taxonomy
Butterfly taxonomy